Finland competed at the 2013 World Championships in Athletics from August 10 to August 18 in Moscow, Russia.

Medallists
The following Finnish competitors won medals at the Championships

Team selection
Finland sends a team consisting of 11 athletes to Moscow. Additional two athletes are reserve. Eero Haapala withdrew due to a repeating injury on August 8.

Track and road events

Field and combined events

Results

Men

Women

References

External links
IAAF World Championships – Finland

Nations at the 2013 World Championships in Athletics
World Championships in Athletics
2013